Baron Culloden (named after Culloden near Inverness) is a title which has been created twice in the Peerage of the United Kingdom for members of the British royal family.

The barony's creation continued the tradition of awarding members of the Royal Family titles from each of the three kingdoms comprising the United Kingdom: England, Scotland and Ireland.

Baron Culloden, first creation (1801)
see Duke of Cambridge

The first creation was on 27 November 1801 for Prince Adolphus Frederick, seventh son of King George III. He was created Duke of Cambridge, Earl of Tipperary and Baron Culloden in the peerage of the United Kingdom. This title became extinct on 17 March 1904 at the death of his son Prince George, the second holder.

Baron Culloden, second creation (1928)
The second creation was on 31 March 1928 for Prince Henry, third son of King George V, who was created Duke of Gloucester, Earl of Ulster and Baron Culloden, in the peerage of the United Kingdom.
Prince Henry, 1st Duke of Gloucester (1900–1974)
Prince Richard, 2nd Duke of Gloucester (born 1944)
Xan Windsor (born 2007), Prince Richard's grandson, is the son of Alexander Windsor, Earl of Ulster, the heir-apparent to the dukedom, and as such uses "Lord Culloden" as a courtesy title.

See also
Duke of Gloucester

References

1801 establishments in the United Kingdom
1904 disestablishments in the United Kingdom
1928 establishments in the United Kingdom
Noble titles created in 1801
Noble titles created in 1928
Baronies in the Peerage of the United Kingdom
Extinct baronies in the Peerage of the United Kingdom
Barons Culloden